Meadow Lake Power Station is a natural gas-fired station owned by SaskPower, located in Meadow Lake, Saskatchewan, Canada and operated as a peaking plant.

Description 

The Meadow Lake Station consists of:
 1 - 44 MW unit, commissioned in 1984

See also 
 List of power stations in Canada
 List of generating stations in Saskatchewan

References

External links 

 SaskPower Station Description

Meadow Lake, Saskatchewan
Natural gas-fired power stations in Saskatchewan
SaskPower